Dave Butterfield (born July 29, 1954) is a former American football defensive back who played college football at the University of Nebraska–Lincoln and attended Sterling High School in Sterling, Colorado. He was drafted by the New York Jets in the eleventh round of the 1977 NFL Draft. He was a consensus All-American in 1976.

References

1954 births
Living people
American football defensive backs
Nebraska Cornhuskers football players
All-American college football players
People from Sterling, Colorado
Players of American football from Colorado